The 1990 Boston Red Sox season was the 90th season in the franchise's Major League Baseball history. The Red Sox finished first in the American League East with a record of 88 wins and 74 losses. It was the third AL East division championship in five years for the Red Sox. However, the team was defeated in a four-game sweep by the Oakland Athletics in the ALCS, as had been the case in 1988.

Offseason
December 6, 1989: Dennis Lamp was signed as a free agent by the Red Sox.
December 6, 1989: Jeff Reardon was signed as a free agent by the Red Sox.
December 19, 1989: Rick Cerone was released by the Red Sox.
December 20, 1989: Sam Horn was released by the Red Sox.
February 15, 1990: Bill Buckner was signed as a free agent by the Red Sox.
February 15, 1990: Greg A. Harris was signed as a free agent by the Red Sox.

Regular season

Highlights
The Red Sox set a major league record, which still stands, for the most times grounding into a double play during a season, 174.

On June 6, the Red Sox got a measure of retribution for Bucky Dent's home run in the 1978 American League East tie-breaker game. While in Boston for a four-game series, the New York Yankees fired Dent as their manager. The Red Sox had just defeated the Yankees in the first two games of the series, giving the Yankees an 18–31 record,  games behind the first-place Red Sox. The firing made Fenway Park arguably the scene of Dent's best moment as a player and worst moment as manager. Dan Shaughnessy of The Boston Globe criticized Yankees owner George Steinbrenner for firing Dent—his 18th managerial change in as many years—in Boston, and rhetorically asked if he couldn't have waited to fire Dent elsewhere. Shaughnessy noted, "if Dent had been fired in Seattle or Milwaukee, this would have been just another event in an endless line of George's jettisons. But it happened in Boston and the nightly news had its hook." Author Bill Pennington called the firing of Dent "merciless." However, Yankees television analyst Tony Kubek blasted at Steinbrenner for the firing in a harsh, angry way. At the beginning of the broadcast of the game on MSG Network, he said to Yankees television play-by-play announcer Dewayne Staats, "George Steinbrenner...mishandled this. You don't take a Bucky Dent (at) the site of one of the greatest home runs in Yankee history and fire him and make it a media circus for the Boston Red Sox." He then stared defiantly on camera and said to Steinbrenner, "You don't do it by telephone, either, George. You do it face to face, eyeball to eyeball...If you really are a winner, you should not have handled this like a loser." He then said, angrily, "George, you're a bully and a coward." He then said that "What all this does, it just wrecks George Steinbrenner's credibility with his players, with the front office and in baseball more than it already is–if that's possible. It was just mishandled." The firing of Dent shook New York to its core and the Yankees flagship radio station then, WABC, which also criticized the firing, ran editorials demanding that Steinbrenner sell the team.

Season standings

Record vs. opponents

Notable transactions
 May 4, 1990: Lee Smith was traded by the Red Sox to the St. Louis Cardinals for Tom Brunansky.
 June 4, 1990: Les Norman was selected by the Red Sox in the 26th round of the 1990 MLB draft, but did not sign.
June 5, 1990: Bill Buckner was released by the Red Sox.
June 8, 1990: Rich Gedman was sent to the Houston Astros as part of a conditional deal.
August 23, 1990: Cecilio Guante signed as a free agent with the Red Sox.
August 30, 1990: The Red Sox traded Jeff Bagwell to the Houston Astros for Larry Andersen.

Opening Day lineup

Source:

Alumni game
The team held an old-timers game on May 19, before a scheduled home game against the Minnesota Twins. Red Sox alumni pitchers Bill Lee, Bill Monbouquette, and Dick Radatz allowed just one hit (to former Detroit Tiger Willie Horton) in the four-inning game, as Boston won by a 2–0 score over a team of MLB alumni from other clubs.

Roster

Statistical leaders 

Source:

Batting 

Source:

Pitching 

Source:

ALCS

Game 1
October 6, 1990, at Fenway Park

Game 2
October 7, 1990, at Fenway Park

Game 3
October 9, 1990, at Oakland–Alameda County Coliseum

Game 4
October 10, 1990, at Oakland–Alameda County Coliseum

Awards and honors
Awards
 Mike Boddicker – Gold Glove Award (P)
 Ellis Burks – Silver Slugger Award (OF), Gold Glove Award (OF)
 Roger Clemens – AL Pitcher of the Month (August)

Accomplishments
 Roger Clemens, American League Leader, Shutouts (4)

All-Star Game
Wade Boggs, third base, starter
Ellis Burks, outfield, reserve
Roger Clemens, pitcher, reserve

Farm system

The Lynchburg Red Sox and Winter Haven Red Sox changed classification from Class A to Class A-Advanced.

The Red Sox shared a DSL team with the Detroit Tigers and San Diego Padres.

Source:

References

External links
1990 Boston Red Sox team page at Baseball Reference
1990 Boston Red Sox season at baseball-almanac.com

Boston Red Sox seasons
American League East champion seasons
Boston Red Sox
Boston Red Sox
Red Sox